Katzow is a municipality in the Vorpommern-Greifswald district, in Mecklenburg-Vorpommern, Germany. It consists of
Katzow
Kühlenhagen
Jägerhof
Netzeband

References

Vorpommern-Greifswald